Krasnaya Zarya is a rural locality (a settlement) and the administrative center of Krasnozorensky District, Oryol Oblast, Russia. Population:

References

Notes

Sources

Rural localities in Oryol Oblast